Events from the year 1815 in Scotland.

Incumbents

Law officers 
 Lord Advocate – Archibald Colquhoun
 Solicitor General for Scotland – Alexander Maconochie

Judiciary 
 Lord President of the Court of Session – Lord Granton
 Lord Justice General – The Duke of Montrose
 Lord Justice Clerk – Lord Boyle

Events 
 February/March – foundation stone of Montrose Academy laid.
 18 June – Battle of Waterloo: Ensign Charles Ewart of the Royal Scots Greys captures the French Imperial Eagle standard.
 1 July – Union Bank of Scotland opens.
 19 September – foundation stones for Regent Bridge and Calton Jail in Edinburgh laid.
 The Nelson Monument, Edinburgh, on Calton Hill, is dedicated.
 Hackness Martello Tower and Battery and Crockness Martello tower in Orkney are completed.
 Dunans and Ferness Bridges and Avoch harbour are completed to the designs of Thomas Telford.
 Glenfinnan Monument erected to mark the landing of "Bonnie Prince Charlie" at the start of the Jacobite rising of 1745 to the design of James Gillespie Graham.
 Armadale Castle on Skye is built in the style of Scottish Baronial architecture to the design of James Gillespie Graham.
 A Jury Court as a division of the Court of Session is introduced.
 Regius Professorships at the University of Glasgow in Midwifery and Surgery are established by King George III.
 The Scottish Widows Fund and Life Assurance Society opens to business as Scotland's first mutual life insurance office.
 On Islay, Ardbeg distillery begins commercial production and Laphroaig distillery is established by Donald and Alexander Johnston.
 The Clyde Shipping Company is set up by John Henderson, William Croil, Donald McPhee and George Jardine Kidston to provide services by paddle steamer.
 Pringle of Scotland, knitwear manufacturer, is established by Robert Pringle in the Borders.
 John Fletcher Macfarlan takes over the family apothecary business in Edinburgh, the predecessor of MacFarlan Smith, and begins to manufacture laudanum.
Aberdeen Savings Bank is formed.

Births 
 11 January
 John A. Macdonald, first Prime Minister of Canada (died 1891 in Ottawa)
 David Stevenson, lighthouse engineer (died 1886)
 22 January – William Brodie, sculptor (died 1881)
 25 March – George Thomson, shipbuilder (died 1866)
 1 April – William Chalmers Burns, evangelical missionary to China (died 1868)
 19 May
 Kate Dickens, née Catherine Hogarth, wife of Charles Dickens (died 1879 in London)
 Hugh Fraser, retailer (died 1873)
 11 June – W McEwan, cricketer (died 1862 in Australia)
 12 June – James Valentine, photographer (died 1879)
 29 August – James Fenton, railway engineer (died 1863)
 20 December – James Legge, Congregationalist missionary to China (died 1897 in Oxford)
 Thomas Stuart Smith, painter and benefactor (died 1869 in Avignon)

Deaths 
 14 January – William Creech, publisher and Lord Provost of Edinburgh (born 1745)
 4 February – John Ferriar, physician and writer (born 1761)
 9 February – Claudius Buchanan, theologian, Church of England missionary to India (born 1766)
 23 February – William Duff, Presbyterian minister and writer on psychology (born 1732)
 10 April – William Roxburgh, Scottish surgeon and botanist (born 1751)
 26 August – John Spalding, politician (born 1763)
 8 September – Andrew Graham, naturalist
 28 September – Gilbert Gerard, theological writer (born 1760)
 9 December – Patrick Miller of Dalswinton, banker and steamboat promoter (born 1730)
 Thomas Keith, soldier (born c.1793)

The arts
 Christian Isobel Johnstone's novel Clan-Albin: A National Tale is published.
 Robert Kirk's The Secret Commonwealth, Gaelic folklore collected in 1691/92, is first published.
 Walter Scott's narrative poem The Lord of the Isles and anonymous novel Guy Mannering are published.
 6-year-old Edgar Allan Poe attends school in Irvine, North Ayrshire.

See also 
 Timeline of Scottish history
 1815 in the United Kingdom

References